Nakhalpara is one of the most densely populated small area in the capital city Dhaka of Bangladesh. 

It is located under Tejgaon Thana & Tejgaon Industrial Area Thana Beside South: Kawran Bazar, farmgate & Tejkunipara, North: Shaheen Bag, Arjat para & Mohakhali, East: Mohakhali Inter City Bus-stand, Nabisco Biscuit Factory & Channel I and West: Old Airport Road, Prime minister's Office.

Nakhalpara is divided into two parts by a rail line of Bangladesh Railway; west side of rail line is called West Nakhalpara and east side is called East Nakhalpara.

Nakhalpara is famous for, it hosts the Prime Minister's Office (Bangladesh)  & MP Hostel
There is SSF Flat, Nakhalpara Jame Mosjid (বড় মসজিদ), Baitun Nur Jame Mosjid, Nakhalpara Baitul  Atiq Jame Mosjid, Nakhalpara Shia Mosque & Mazer Complex, Nakhalpara Hossain Ali High School, Nakhalpara Hazrat Belal(R) Mosjid & Madrash Complex, Haji Moron Ali Islamia Kamil Madrasah Complex, Nakhalpara Government Primary School, New Ananda English School, Rose Bud Kindergarten, Nakhalpara Community Center & Nakhalpara Bazar.

Nakhalpara is administered by Dhaka North City Corporation under the zone- 3, DNCC Ward No-25. Newly elected councillor Abdullah Al Manzur for DNCC Ward No-25 & councilor reserved for Woman Nazmum Nahar Helen for Ward-25, 24 and 35.

Nakhalpara is situated at more or less in the center of Dhaka City surrounded by Prime Minister office, Farmgate(Road junction), Karwan bazar (prime Wholesale market in the city), Mohakhali, Tajgaon Industrial area and Tejgaon Rail Station. But the neighborhood is not a planned residential area. vicinity was developed by due to its location convenience during 1960-1990 an But the area remained ignored and neglected by Dhaka City Corporation (DCC) for long. Many real estate companies have built hundreds of apartments in this area. The roads and lanes of this area are very narrow and both sides of the roads are occupied by the grabbers.

Gallery

References

^^http://www.dncc.gov.bd/

Neighbourhoods in Dhaka